Motialmara is a village in Azad Kashmir, Pakistan approximately 1.5 miles northeast of Rawalakot. It is located in a valley surrounded by snow-capped mountains

Population
Approximately 12,000 people live in this village, over 90% to the Sudhan tribe remaining include Pashtun immigrants who are shop keepers and refugees from Indian administered Kashmir.

Occupation
Most of the population located in this district live on subsistence farming.  Some  of the population  has migrated to England and the United States.  However, quite a few work in the Middle East, and these are temporary workers.

Notable people

Sardar Imtiaz Khan is a political and social leader who leads the Kashmiri Community in New Jersey and New York. He is a philanthropist and has helped build the Islamic Center in New Jersey.

References 

Populated places in Poonch District, Pakistan